Euseius rhododendronis is a species of mite in the family Phytoseiidae.

References

rhododendronis
Articles created by Qbugbot
Animals described in 1970